Jennifer R. Cochran is an American bioegineer.

Cochran completed a bachelor's degree in biochemistry at the University of Delaware in 1995, and pursued doctoral study in biological chemistry at the Massachusetts Institute of Technology. After graduating in 2001, she remained at MIT as a postdoctoral fellow. Cochran later joined the Stanford University faculty, where she was named Shriram Chair of the Department of Bioengineering. She was elected a fellow of the American Institute for Medical and Biological Engineering in 2018.

References

Year of birth missing (living people)
Living people
21st-century American engineers
American bioengineers
American women engineers
University of Delaware alumni
Massachusetts Institute of Technology alumni
Stanford University faculty
Fellows of the American Institute for Medical and Biological Engineering